The 1961 Cotton Bowl Classic was the 25th edition of the college football bowl game, played at the Cotton Bowl in Dallas, Texas, on Monday, January 2. Part of the 1960–61 bowl game season, it matched two conference champions, the seventh-ranked Arkansas Razorbacks of the Southwest Conference (SWC), and the #10 Duke Blue Devils of the Atlantic Coast Conference (ACC). With a late score, underdog Duke won 7–6, in front of 74,000 spectators.

New Year's Day was on Sunday in 1961; the major bowl games were played the following day.

Teams

Arkansas

Arkansas won the Southwest Conference in 1960, led by junior star Lance Alworth (RB/PR/DB/P), who led the nation in punt return yardage, and was ninth in the country in kick return yardage. The Hogs defeated #11 Texas and #10 Rice, but lost to #20 Baylor and second-ranked Ole Miss.

It was the Razorbacks' third appearance in the Cotton Bowl, and the first under third-year head coach Frank Broyles.

Duke

Duke won the Atlantic Coast Conference, but lost its final two games, on the road at North Carolina and UCLA. The Blue Devils had four first team-all conference players. This was the program's sixth appearance in a major bowl, and first in the Cotton.

Game summary
In a game full of stars such as Lance Alworth of Arkansas and Don Altman and Tee Moorman of Duke, Dave Unser came up biggest. His block of Mickey Cissel's extra point attempt was the difference in the final score.

The games was scoreless until late in the third quarter. Alworth provided a memorable play when he snagged a high snap on a punt. Under pressure from Duke defenders, he then rolled right and sprinted upfield. While running he punted the ball deep, which went out at the Duke 2. Two plays later he returned a Duke punt for a touchdown. The kick was blocked by Unser, keeping the Hogs' lead at six points.

In the fourth quarter, the Blue Devils hooked together five passes from Altman to Moorman in one drive that culminated in the tying touchdown and go-ahead extra point.

Duke improved to 3–3 in bowl appearances, all in major bowls, while the Arkansas postseason record dropped to 2–2–2, with two losses and a tie in the Cotton Bowl.

Aftermath
In the nineteen seasons under Broyles, Arkansas played in four Cotton Bowls and four Sugar Bowls; the 1964 team went undefeated.

It was the first of three consecutive conference titles for Duke, but the Blue Devils did not appear in another bowl game until 1989.

Duke did not earn another bowl victory until 2015, when the Blue Devils defeated Indiana in the Pinstripe Bowl.

References

External links
Cotton Bowl Classic – January 2, 1961
Duke Blue Devils football – 2017 media guide – 1961 Cotton Bowl – page 102

Cotton Bowl Classic
Cotton Bowl Classic
Arkansas Razorbacks football bowl games
Duke Blue Devils football bowl games
January 1961 sports events in the United States
Cotton Bowl